Thomas William Drumm (July 12, 1871 – October 24, 1933) was an Irish-born prelate of the Roman Catholic Church. He served as Bishop of Des Moines from 1919 until his death in 1933.

Biography
Thomas Drumm was born in Fore, County Westmeath, to Thomas and Mary (née Cullen) Drumm. He came to the United States in 1888, and began his studies at St. Joseph's College in Dubuque, Iowa. He completed his theological studies at the Grand Seminary of Montreal in Quebec, Canada, where he was ordained to the priesthood by Archbishop Paul Bruchési on December 21, 1901. He then furthered his studies at the Catholic University of America in Washington, D.C. He labored in the diocesan missions of Dubuque, and became pastor of St. Patrick's Church in Cedar Rapids in 1915.

On March 28, 1919, Drumm was appointed the second Bishop of Des Moines by Pope Benedict XV. He received his episcopal consecration on the following May 21 from Archbishop John Joseph Keane, with Bishops James J. Davis and Edmond Heelan serving as co-consecrators. In 1924 he became the first Catholic bishop to preach regularly on the radio, offering monthly broadcasts on WHO. He remained as bishop until his death at age 62.

References

1871 births
1933 deaths
People from County Westmeath
Irish emigrants to the United States (before 1923)
American Roman Catholic clergy of Irish descent
20th-century Roman Catholic bishops in the United States
Roman Catholic Archdiocese of Dubuque
Roman Catholic bishops of Des Moines
Catholic University of America alumni